Lady Harry is a 1978 play by Norman Krasna.  It had its world premiere in London.

Plot
An aristocrat is murdered so someone can pretend to be her husband.

Reception
The Guardian called it "dreadful".

References

1978 plays
Plays by Norman Krasna